The Association of African Universities (AAU) is a university association of African universities based in Accra, Ghana. With member institutions all around Africa, AAU provides a forum for cooperation and exchange of information on higher education and research policies.

AAU was founded in Rabat, Morocco on November 12, 1967, following recommendations made at an earlier conference organized by the United Nations Educational Scientific and Cultural Organization (UNESCO) in Antananarivo, Madagascar in September 1962. Antananarivo meeting called upon its participants to establish an organization for mutual cooperation.
 
The Antananarivo recommendations were taken up by a preparatory Committee of the heads of African institutions of higher education, which met in Khartoum in September 1963 and drafted the founding constitution of the association. With an initial membership of 34, the association now has over 340 members from 46 countries, cutting across language and other divides.
 
The association has provided a platform for research, reflection, consultation, debates, co-operation and collaboration on issues pertaining to higher education. It has provided a range of services to its members and served African higher education in a variety of ways. It has established and increased its role in the five sub-regions of Africa and is thus able, at reasonable notice, to assemble teams of experts in relevant fields from the sub-regions.
 
The association possesses a unique capacity to convene higher education institutional leaders and policy-makers from all parts of the continent and on key issues related to African higher education and development, as demonstrated in the WTO/GATS workshop held in Ghana in April 2004. In addition, the association provides leadership in the identification of emerging issues and support for debating them and facilitating appropriate follow-up action by its members, partners and other stakeholders.

See also
 List of higher education associations and alliances
 Universities in Africa

References

Further reading
 Livsey, Timothy. "Imagining an Imperial Modernity: Universities and the West African Roots of Colonial Development." Journal of Imperial and Commonwealth History 44.6 (2016): 952–975.

External links
 
Full list of member universities
 Programs & Services

 
College and university associations and consortia in Africa
Organizations established in 1967
Educational organisations based in Ghana